Spike, Mike, Slackers, & Dykes: A Guided Tour Across a Decade of American Independent Cinema (1996) is a non-fiction book about independent cinema by John Pierson. The title references Pierson's interactions with Spike Lee, Michael Moore, Richard Linklater of the film Slacker and the lesbian-oriented film Go Fish.

References

External links
Google Books

1996 non-fiction books
Books about film